Dir was a princely state in a subsidiary alliance with the British Raj, located within the North-West Frontier Province. Following the Partition of British India, Dir remained independent and unaligned until February 1948, when the Dominion of Pakistan accepted its accession.

The princely state ceased to exist as a distinct political entity in 1969, when it was fully incorporated into Pakistan. The territory it once covered is today located in the Pakistani province of Khyber Pakhtunkhwa, forming two northern and southern districts called Upper Dir and Lower Dir, respectively.

Geography 
Most of the state lay in the valley of the Panjkora river, which originates in the Hindu Kush mountains and joins the Swat River near Chakdara.

History

Early period 
Dir took its name from its main settlement, Dir, the location of the ruler's palace.

The territories surrounding Dir were populated by their current ethnic majority, the Pakhtuns, beginning from the end of the 14th century. The Pakhtun were divided in several clans (khels), often battling one against the other. The three clans which conquered the zone were the Yusafzai (Painda Khel, Sultan Khel, Osakhel, Nasirdinkhel), Tarkanrai. The Dir territory was populated in the 16th century by the Malizai sub-tribe of the Yusufzai, who took control of the zone assimilating or chasing away the previous inhabitants (Dilazak in Bajour, Jandool, Maiden, and Swatis from areas east of Panjkora)  and within this tribe the most prominent fractions became the Painda khel and Sultan khel.

By the 17th century a section of the Painda khel, coming from the Kohan village in the valley of Nihag (a Panjkora tributary), seized the trade routes with Chitral and Afghanistan.

Ruling khans 
The Khanate is said to have been established in the 17th century by Painda khel leader and charismatic mystic figure Akhund Ilyas Khan, who found the village of Dir. 
His descendants took the name Akhund khel, preserving and expanding their leadership becoming the Khans of Dir.

The annex families aiding in ruling 
The state affairs were run with experts of each field i.e., the fighters, the administration, the Jamadars, and the Hakeem (traditional doctors and male nurses). The people were kept under strict rules to be observed, the education system was nil, and nobody was allowed to go to the schools. The people were bound to wear the White-Cap (traditional cap) but were not allowed to wear it cross (on head) and this was the sign of the traditional dress. Today, the locals and politicians are still using the White-Caps as their identity. 

The Jamadars were supposed to collect grains for the government and were keeping the record of each farmer. The local people were treated with traditional medicines and their health was the primary objective to keep them strong. 

The people of Dir are mostly of the Yousafzai tribe of Pashtoons and played a vital role in the then Princely state. The fighters were properly trained and the forts were built for the purpose of keeping the local fighters (Malesha - local name).

Horses were part of the fighters' belongings; there were good quality horses and thus patrolling was made with the help horses in the hilly areas. 

A road leading to Chitral was built with the agreement of the British Raj with the Dir Rulers; the British were paying annually for this purpose as "Rahdari".

The Sultan Alam Khan family: Besides ruling, (then and now) the Dir rulers sought the moral and strategic support of this well-educated family from time to time who helped run the system. Sultan Alam Khan's family is one of the moral supporters of the Rulers, the family is part of the Yousafzai tribe of Pakhtoons living in the outskirts of Temergara City on the edge of the road/river Panjkora. Being the elder of the family, Sultan Alam Khan is much aware of the system of the past and shares his views adding charm to the history written by Muhammad Sanaul Haq Qazi (from the Qazi family of Swat Valley). The people are almost 100 percent speaking pure accent Pashto, later on added some Arabic/Urdu words and Dari or Persian. 

Calling back the memories of the Dir State, Sultan Alam Khan added "the ruler was good, as compare to the current Pakistani system of ruling", the judiciary, the healthcare, and the enforcement of rules were exemplary, he further added.

The Alam family plays a vital role in the current scenario. They are part of the Pakistan Peoples Party. In business Jan Alam Khan is working as CEO and town planner and got Paradise City, the largest housing scheme of the KP Province of Pakistan.

The younger and energetic brother, Sultan Yousaf, is involved in the private sector education and is running a dozen schools in the Dir area and its neighbouring districts. 

The ruling family's elder, Nawabzada Mehmood Khan (ex-minister), is also promoting the educational sector of health science for boys and girls. The youngsters are then part of the Medicare facility in the country and abroad. Khan is also part of the Pakistan People Party.

Jandool rule and fort 
Muhammad Umara Khan took power while killing his brother inside the fort and succeeded as the khan of Jando(o)l.

According to the Sultan Alam Khan (age 85 years), "Umara Khan killed his real brother inside the fort," added his son, Sardar Alam Khan, in the historical narration of Umara Khan.

This was the beginning of Umara Khan's control.  Later on, he had the Jandool Fort constructed. The large building inside the fort was built in 1960 by Nawabzada Shahabuddin Khan (known as Jandool Khan), the son of Shah Jehan Khan (the then Nawab of Dir). The fort is located strategically controlling the four directions with the bordering area of Bajaur, which borders Afghanistan. The Father of Jan Alam Khan (son of Sultan Alam Khan) related that before shifting / use of this fort, the government of Pakistan took over charge of the Fort at night time. Thus this building remain vacant till the date this was used by Sultan Yousaf (son of Sultan Alam Khan) for the educational purpose.

Jandool Fort was built with purpose of defence. Its corners contain the watch towers and thus the fighters can control either side of the building to keep enemies away. The building has a large number of facilities including a cooking area for hundreds of fighters. A water pond in the middle of the lawn not only provides a good source of water but also adds some beauty to the place. The sons/grandsons of Umara Khan are not living in the Dir area, but their servants are residing beside the building. The fort has lush green areas on four-sides, large trees are adding charm to its beauty, the reception is designed with the aim of receiving guests with honour and good protocols.   

In 1881 the ruler of Dir, Muhammad Sharif Khan, was chased away by Khan Umara Khan of Jandool, who conquered Dir, Swat, and the Malakand area. In 1895, however, while the forces of Umara Khan were besieging a British force near Malakand, Muhammad Sharif Khan decided to make his soldiers join the British relief force coming in aid, the Chitral Expedition. During that expedition, Sharif Khan made an agreement with the British Government to keep the road to Chitral open in return for a subsidy. The British eventually won the war and exiled Umara Khan. As a reward for his help, Sharif Khan was given the whole of Dir and also the lower Swat (the latter territory would be lost in 1917 to the Wali of Swat).

The ruling Nawabs 
The hereditary Nawab Khan Bahador title (nawab for short) was granted in 1897 to Mohammad Sharif Khan and inherited by Sharif's eldest son, Aurangzeb Badshah Khan (nicknamed as Charha Nawab), who ruled between 1904 and 1925. In 1906 his younger brother, Miangul Jan (Munda Khan), tried in vain to wrest power with the assistance of the Khan of Barwa, Sayed Ahmad Khan, a former ally of Mohammad Sharif. A second attempt in 1913 was crowned by success, but for a very short time, as in 1914 Aurangzeb regained the rule over Dir. Also, the other son of Mohammad Sharif, Mohammad Isa Khan, attempted around 1915 to seize the Dir throne by allying with the Khan of Barwa, but Aurangzeb managed to preserve his rule.

At Aurangzeb's death, in 1925, the title passed to his eldest son, Mohammad Shah Jahan Khan, who was supported by the British Government against the small rival faction that favored his brother Alamzeb Khan. Alamzeb was exiled in 1928 because of his attempts to take power. Shah Jahan Khan was loyal to the British, who nominated him to KBE in 1933. In 1947, Jahan Khan sent his troops to support Pakistan during the First Kashmir War, and in 1948 united his princely state with the new Dominion of Pakistan. He also nominated his son Muhammad Shah Khan Khusro as successor and other sons (Shahabuddin Khan and Mohammad Shah) governors of different provinces.

Pakistan 
On 8 Feb 1948, Dir acceded to the newly-created Muslim dominion of Pakistan, initially continuing as one of the surviving princely states of Pakistan. 
The politics of the late Nawabs are described as reactionary and harsh. The Italian anthropologist Fosco Maraini, who visited the state in 1959 during an expedition towards Hindu-Kush, reported the opinion of the people that the Nawab Jahan Khan (who was about 64 years old at that time) was a tyrannical leader, denying his subjects any freedom of speech and instruction, governing the land with a number of henchmen, and seizing for his harem any girl or woman he wanted. Maraini also noticed the lack of schools, sewers, and paved roads, and the presence of just a rudimentary newly-built hospital. The Nawab was negatively compared to the Wali of Swat, whose liberal politics allowed his state to enter into the modern era.

As a consequence, uprisings began eventually to explode. A repressed revolt in 1959 is reported in Maraini's account. Another insurrection in 1960 led to the death of 200 soldiers and put the Nawab in a bad light in the view of the press. General Yahya decided to exile Jahan Khan, who would die in 1968. His throne passed in October 1961 to his eldest son, Mohammad Shah Khosru Khan, educated in India and a serving Major General of the Pakistan Army. However, the effective rule of Dir was taken by the Pakistani government's Political Agent.
 
A few years later, on 28 July 1969, the Dir state was incorporated into Pakistan, ceasing its political existence. The royal status of the Nawabs was abolished in 1972, at the same time as most other princes of Pakistan.

Rulers Timeline 
The information for the following table stems from Who's Who in the Dir, Swat, and Chitral Agency.
Encyclopædia Britannica and accounts by local people dating back to the 17th century.

||9 November 1960 – 28 July 1969||Nawab Mohammad Shah Khan

Demographics 
The population of the state in 1911 amounted to about 100,000 people according to Encyclopædia Britannica, rising to 250,000 in 1931 and falling back to 107,000 in 1951.

At the 1947 Partition of India, there was a Muslim majority in Dir with small minorities of Hindus and Sikhs, many of whom left for India during partition.

Flag 
The state flag contained several Islamic symbols and three sentences: the top writing is the Bismillah: "In the name of God, the Most Gracious, the Most Merciful", the center one is the shahada in the Urdu language: "There is no god but God, Muhammad is the messenger of God". The bottom phrase reads "with the help of God, victory is near" in the Arabic language. The flag also had a red variant with the same drawings.

See also 
 Upper Dir District
 Lower Dir District

References

External links and Sources 
 Government of Khyber Pakhtunkhwa

Princely states of Pakistan
Princely states of India
Muslim princely states of India
Dir District
States and territories disestablished in 1969
History of Khyber Pakhtunkhwa
Pashtun dynasties
1800s establishments in India
1969 disestablishments in Pakistan
Former monarchies of Asia